Tim Weatherald (born 31 July 1977) is a former Australian rules footballer with the Norwood Football Club and the Sturt Football Club of the SANFL. He played 253 games with the Sturt Football Club, but left in 2008 to join the Redlegs.  He won the 2002 Magarey Medal, jointly with his Sturt teammate Jade Sheedy, and that same year won the club's best and fairest and was a member of Sturt's 2002 premiership team.

He was part of the team celebrations that were cruelly cut short by the Bali bombing and wrote a book about his experiences.

After 13 years with the Double Blues in 2008, he shifted to the Norwood Football Club.

Notes

External links

1977 births
Sturt Football Club players
Norwood Football Club players
Magarey Medal winners
Living people
Australian rules footballers from South Australia